Marcel Ketelaer (born 3 November 1977) is a German professional football coach and a former striker. He is the sporting director for Admira Wacker Mödling.

References

External links 
 
 

1977 births
Living people
Sportspeople from Mönchengladbach
German footballers
Footballers from North Rhine-Westphalia
Association football forwards
Germany under-21 international footballers
Germany B international footballers
Bundesliga players
2. Bundesliga players
Austrian Football Bundesliga players
Borussia Mönchengladbach players
Borussia Mönchengladbach II players
Hamburger SV players
1. FC Nürnberg players
Rot Weiss Ahlen players
SK Rapid Wien players
German expatriate footballers
German expatriate sportspeople in Austria
Expatriate footballers in Austria
SK Vorwärts Steyr managers